Kippax may refer to:

Kippax, West Yorkshire, a village in England
Kippax Centre, a suburban centre in Canberra, Australia, named after Alan Kippax
Kippax Plantation, an archaeological site and former home of Robert Bolling and Jane Rolfe in Hopewell, Virginia
The Kippax, a stand at Manchester City's Football Club's Maine Road stadium

People with the surname
Alan Kippax (1897–1972), Australian cricketer, uncle of H. G. Kippax
H. G. Kippax (1920–1999), Australian journalist
Peter Kippax (1940–2017), English cricketer
Peter Kippax (footballer) (1922–1987), English footballer
John Kippax  the pen name of English science fiction writer John Charles Hynam 
Susan Kippax (born 1941), Australian social psychologist